Lycaena salustius, the common copper or the coastal copper, is a butterfly of the family Lycaenidae. It is endemic to New Zealand. It is known in the Maori language as pepe para riki, a name that is shared with a few other members of the genus Lycaena native to New Zealand.

The wingspan is 24–35 mm. Adults are on wing from October to April.

The larvae feed on Muehlenbeckia species.

See also
 Butterflies of New Zealand

References

External links
Species info

Salustius
Butterflies described in 1793
Butterflies of New Zealand